Gea heptagon is a species of orb weaver spiders in the family Araneidae. It is found in Pacific Islands, Australia, and a range from has been introduced into United States and Argentina.

References

External links

 

Araneidae
Articles created by Qbugbot
Spiders described in 1850